Porto Novo may refer to the following places:

 Porto-Novo, the capital of Benin
 Porto Novo, Cape Verde, a city on the island of Santo Antão, Cape Verde 
 Portonovo, a village in Sanxenxo, Galicia, Spain
 Porto Novo, the former name of Parangipettai, a town in Tamil Nadu, India
 Porto Novo do Cunha, the former name of Além Paraíba in the state of Minas Gerais, Brazil